Chemayevo (Sämay) is a rural locality (a village) in Uryush-Bittulinsky Selsoviet, Karaidelsky District, Bashkortostan, Russia. The population was 66 as of 2010. There are 7 streets.

Geography 
Chemayevo is located 57 km southwest of Karaidel (the district's administrative centre) by road. Dubrovka is the nearest rural locality.

References 

Rural localities in Karaidelsky District